Millicent Ndoro (born 19 September 1986) is a Kenyan sprinter. She represented her country at three consecutive Commonwealth Games, starting in 2014 and the latest one being the 2022  Commonwealth Games In Birmingham, United Kingdom. In 2019, she won the bronze medal in the women's 4 × 100 metres relay at the 2019 African Games held in Rabat, Morocco.

She is Kenyan national record co-holder in the 4 × 100 metres relay.

International competitions

1Did not start in the semifinals

Personal bests
Outdoor
100 metres – 11.86 (Nairobi 2013)
200 metres – 23.92 (Nairobi 2016)

References

1986 births
Living people
People from Kisii County
Kenyan female sprinters
Athletes (track and field) at the 2015 African Games
Athletes (track and field) at the 2019 African Games
Athletes (track and field) at the 2014 Commonwealth Games
Athletes (track and field) at the 2018 Commonwealth Games
African Games bronze medalists for Kenya
African Games medalists in athletics (track and field)
Commonwealth Games competitors for Kenya
Athletes (track and field) at the 2022 Commonwealth Games
20th-century Kenyan women
21st-century Kenyan women